Employee offboarding describes the separation process when an employee leaves a company. The offboarding process might involve a phased transfer of knowledge from the departing employee to a new or existing employee; an exit interview; return of any company property; and various processes from the company's human resources, information technology, or legal functions.

Purpose 
An employee may leave a company through resignation, termination of employment and layoffs, retirement, or for other reasons. When this happens, the company will face a number of risks. These may include incomplete projects, loss of communication with clients, security risks, compliance risks, and other factors. An employee offboarding process is generally designed to mitigate risks and potential losses in the separation process.

Offboarding often includes the collection of feedback from the exiting employee about their experience in the organization, and possible improvements to its culture. It is considered the final phase of an employee lifecycle which includes phases such as recruitment, onboarding, development, retention, and exit or offboarding.

Steps and workflows 
Employee offboarding consists of numerous steps and workflows. These may include:

 Documenting standard operating procedures (SOPs), and knowledge transfer including contact lists, file and record locations, and status reports on ongoing projects and tasks
 Software removal
 Termination of logins and/or accounts such as bank accounts, phones, and email addresses, with redirection to a new responsible party
 Asset reclamation such as computer hardware and other devices
 Finalize paperwork such as Non-Disclosure Agreements, health and retirement benefits, Non-compete agreements, tax documents, and outstanding reimbursements as well as any documentation required for compliance, particularly in regulated industries
 Removal from company website, social media profiles, org charts, and other active publications
 Reclamation or destruction of sensitive and security items such as ID badges, parking tags, uniforms, and access cards or keys
 Exit interviews that may include questionnaires and surveys, as well as reviewing the information collected by company stakeholders, can be conducted effectively through an LMS platform

Best practices 

Employee offboarding includes a number of best practices. should be a positive experience for the employee and the company. This would include the formal acknowledgement of the employee's time at the company and the value they created. It should also be a time when companies collect valuable feedback on ways to improve the overall employee experience and culture, and to transfer knowledge wholly and efficiently. It is a common practice to facilitate knowledge transfer by making documentation an ongoing part of every employee's experience from the time they are onboarded, to the time they leave. This includes the ongoing creation and updating of SOPs. Termination of employment on the best possible terms makes ongoing communications possible. This can be beneficial to the employee who might need referrals for future employment, or copies of documentation. It can also benefit the company when knowledge has not been completely transferred, and follow-up is necessary.

Documentation at the time of employee offboarding will reduce potential issues. In addition to current SOPs, an employer should request and receive a formal letter of resignation. The employer should provide documentation to the employee, too, such as a record of benefits, tax documents, and a final paycheck and a final record of income earned.

Network administrators, human resources managers, department managers, and others who are responsible for different aspects of the offboarding process should be notified, with clear next steps. These might include account closures, login changes, and other security measures. Documents stored locally or on the cloud should be transferred to new stakeholders.

In the exit interview, clear and accurate reasons for the termination of employment should be documented and filed for future use. If the employee left on good terms, then it should be made clear that the possibility of a return is likely in the future.

See also 
 Induction programme
 Termination of employment
 Layoff

References 

Business terms
Human resource management
Outsourcing
Corporate jargon
Termination of employment